Pierre Alain Gouaméné Guiahouli (born 15 June 1966) is an Ivorian former professional footballer who played as a goalkeeper. He is the head coach of the Ivory Coast U23 national team.

Club career
Gouaméné played for ASEC Mimosas, Raja Casablanca, AS Trouville – Deauville, and FC Toulouse.

International career
Gouaméné holds the record of games (24) and participations (seven) in the African Nations Cup as goalkeeper of the Ivory Coast national team. He was succeeded in the Elephants' goal by Losseni Konaté in 2000.

Coaching career
After his playing career, Gouaméné was goalkeeper coach of the national team and in summer 2006 changed posts to become national coach of the Ivory Coast teams Under-15 and Under 17.

References

External links 
 

1966 births
Living people
People from Gôh-Djiboua District
Ivorian footballers
Association football goalkeepers
Ivory Coast international footballers
Africa Cup of Nations-winning players
1992 King Fahd Cup players
1988 African Cup of Nations players
1990 African Cup of Nations players
1992 African Cup of Nations players
1994 African Cup of Nations players
1996 African Cup of Nations players
1998 African Cup of Nations players
2000 African Cup of Nations players
Ligue 1 players
FC Lorient players
Angers SCO players
Toulouse FC players
Raja CA players
ASEC Mimosas players
Ivorian expatriate footballers
Ivorian expatriate sportspeople in France
Expatriate footballers in France
Ivorian expatriate sportspeople in Morocco
Expatriate footballers in Morocco